Teposcolula District is located in the center of the Mixteca Region of the State of Oaxaca, Mexico.

Municipalities

The district includes the following municipalities:
 
Chilapa de Diaz
La Trinidad Vista Hermosa
San Andrés Lagunas
San Antonino Monte Verde
San Antonio Acutla
San Bartolo Soyaltepec
San Juan Teposcolula
San Pedro Nopala
San Pedro Topiltepec
San Pedro y San Pablo Teposcolula
San Pedro Yucunama
San Sebastián Nicananduta
San Vicente Nuñú
Santa María Nduayaco
Santiago Nejapilla
Santiago Yolomécatl
Santo Domingo Tlatayapam
Santo Domingo Tonaltepec
Tamazulapam del Progreso
Teotongo
Villa Tejupam de la Unión

References

Districts of Oaxaca
Mixteca Region